Men's Giant Slalom World Cup 1994/1995

Calendar

Final point standings

In Men's Giant Slalom World Cup 1994/95 all results count.

Note:

In the last race only the best racers were allowed to compete and only the best 15 finishers were awarded with points.

References 

World Cup
FIS Alpine Ski World Cup men's giant slalom discipline titles